Hickory Motor Speedway is a short track located in Hickory, North Carolina.  It is one of stock car racing's most storied venues, and is often referred to as the "World's Most Famous Short Track" and the "Birthplace of the NASCAR Stars".

The track first opened in 1951 as a  dirt track.  Gwyn Staley won the first race at the speedway and later became the first track champion.  Drivers such as Junior Johnson, Ned Jarrett, and Ralph Earnhardt also became track champions in the 1950s, with Earnhardt  winning five of them.

In 1953, NASCAR's Grand National Series (later the NASCAR Cup Series) visited the track for the first time.  Tim Flock won the first race at the speedway, which became a regular part of the Grand National schedule.  After winning his track championship in 1952, Junior Johnson became the most successful Grand National driver at Hickory, winning there seven times.

The track has been re-configured three times in its history.  The track became a 0.4-mile (644 meters) dirt track in 1955, which was paved for the first time during the 1967 season.  In 1970, the Hickory track was shortened to a length of 0.363 miles (584 meters).

Hickory was dropped from the Grand National schedule after the 1971 season when R. J. Reynolds began sponsoring the newly christened NASCAR Winston Cup Series and dropped all races under 250 miles (402 kilometers) from the schedule.  It remained in use as a popular NASCAR Late Model Sportsman Series venue.  When the series was reformed as the Budweiser Late Model Series (later the Busch Grand National Series and currently the Xfinity Series) in 1982, Hickory played a prominent part of its first season, hosting six of the series' 28 races.  Drivers Jack Ingram and Tommy Houston, two former track champions, each won eight times at the track in the Busch Series.

As more tracks began hosting Busch Series races, Hickory's involvement was progressively reduced to two races a year by 1987, and then just the Easter weekend by 1995.  By 1998, the Busch Grand National Series began adding more races at Winston Cup Series tracks, and Hickory was dropped from the schedule after 17 years.

Hickory is still used as a venue for NASCAR's club racing division, the Advance Auto Parts Weekly Series, Carolina Pro Late Model Series, Carolina Crate Modified Series, Pro All Stars Series South Super Late Models and the CARS Tour featuring Late Model Stocks and Pro Late Model touring series cars.

External links
Official Site of Hickory Motor Speedway

Motorsport venues in North Carolina
Hickory, North Carolina
1951 establishments in North Carolina
Sports venues completed in 1951
NASCAR tracks